Warren Vaché (born February 21, 1951) is an American jazz trumpeter, cornetist, and flugelhornist.  He was born in Rahway, New Jersey, United States. He came from a musical family as his father was a bassist. In 1976, he released his first album. He has often worked with Scott Hamilton and has some popularity among swing audiences.

Warren Vaché's father is Warren Vaché Sr., who was a jazz double-bassist. His brother Allan Vaché is also a musician.

Discography

As leader
 First Time Out (Monmouth Evergreen, 1976)
 Blues Walk (Dreamstreet, 1978)
 Jillian (Concord Jazz, 1979)		
 Polished Brass (Concord Jazz, 1979)
 Skyscrapers (Concord Jazz, 1980) with Scott Hamilton
 Iridescence (Concord Jazz, 1981)
 Midtown Jazz (Concord Jazz. 1982)
 Easy Going (Concord Jazz, 1986) 
 Warm Evenings (Concord, 1989) with  The Beaux Arts String Quartet
 Horn of Plenty (Muse, 1994) 
 Talk To Me Baby (Muse, 1996)
 Warren Plays Warren with Kenny Drew Jr., Jimmy Cobb, Randy Sandke (Nagel-Heyer, 1996)
 An Affair to Remember with Brian Lemon (Zephyr, 1997)
 Shine with Tony Coe, Alan Barnes, Brian Lemon (Zephyr, 1997)
 What Is There to Say? with Joe Puma, Murray Wall, Eddie Locke (Nagel-Heyer, 1999)
 2gether (Nagel-Heyer, 2000) with Bill Charlap
 The Best Thing for You (Nagel-Heyer, 2001)
 The Warren Vache Quintet Remembers Benny Carter (Arbors, 2015)
 Songs Our Fathers Taught Us (Arbors, 2019)

As sideman
With Howard Alden 
 The Howard Alden Trio Plus Special Guests Ken Peplowski & Warren Vache (Concord, 1989)
 I Remember Django (Arbors, 2010)
With Benny Carter
Benny Carter Songbook (MusicMasters, 1996)
Benny Carter Songbook Volume II (MusicMasters, 1997)
With Benny Goodman
 Live at Carnegie Hall 40th Anniversary Concert (London, 1978)
With Houston Person
So Nice (HighNote, 2011)
Rain or Shine (HighNote, 2017)
With Bucky Pizzarelli
 Five for Freddie (Arbors, 2007)
With André Previn
 What Headphones? (Angel, 1993)
With George Shearing
 George Shearing in Dixieland (Concord, 1989)
With George Wein
 Wein, Women and Song and More, George Wein Plays and Sings (Arbors)

References

1951 births
American jazz cornetists
American jazz flugelhornists
American jazz trumpeters
American male trumpeters
Rahway High School alumni
Muse Records artists
Living people
People from Rahway, New Jersey
21st-century trumpeters
21st-century American male musicians
American male jazz musicians
Arbors Records artists
Concord Records artists
Nagel-Heyer Records artists